Mariana Duque was the defending champion, but decided not to participate.

Anna Karolína Schmiedlová won the tournament, defeating Marina Erakovic in the final, 6–2, 6–3.

Seeds

Main draw

Finals

Top half

Bottom half

References 
 Main draw

The Oaks Club Challenger - Singles